Congregation Shaare Zedek (Gates of Righteousness) is a Conservative synagogue located on West 93rd Street in Manhattan.

On July 27, 2017, despite the efforts of preservationists to save it, a New York State Supreme Court judge approved the sale of the building to a developer who planned to tear it down and build a 14-story condominium.

History

Founded in 1837, by Polish Jews, Shaare Zedek is the third oldest Jewish congregation in New York City.  The congregation originally met at 38 Henry Street on Manhattan's Lower East Side.  In 1850, it purchased a building at 38 Henry Street (still on the Lower East Side) that was originally built by a Quaker congregation in 1828 that had been converted for use as a synagogue by congregation Ansche Chesed in 1840.  The congregation replaced this building with a new building on the same property in 1891, and in 1900 opened a Moorish style branch synagogue at 25 West 118th Street in the newly fashionable neighborhood of Harlem, in time for the Jewish New Year.  The Henry Street building was sold to Congregation Mishkan Israel Anshei Suwalk in 1911, and the two branches consolidated uptown.  In 1922, the Harlem building was sold to Chevra Talmud Torah Augustow as their current Neoclassical building was being designed and built by the architecture firm of Sommerfeld and Steckler.

Over the years, Shaare Zedek has been home to some of the country's great rabbis including Philip R. Alstat, Israel Goldfarb, and Isaac Kurtzlow along with such esteemed cantors as David Roitman, Frank Birnbaum and Martin Kozlowsky.

Recent years

From 2009 to 2014, the congregation was led by Rabbi William Plevan.  Although Shaare Zedek was the last Conservative synagogue in the area to allow fully egalitarian worship, women now participate in every aspect of the service and the congregation was recently served by a female rabbi.  While preserving the traditional liturgy quite closely and committing to a fairly strict observance of Jewish law, the community is generally politically and socially progressive.

In October 2016, citing financial problems connected with the upkeep of the building as well as the Bayside Cemetery in Queens, the synagogue announced that it had signed a contract with a developer to sell the building, which would be replaced with a 14-story condominium, of which Shaare Zedek would own and occupy three floors.  The sale price was $34.3 million, which would enable the synagogue to "get out of the cemetery business," according to its president.  In response, resident of the area, concerned not only about the loss of an historic building, but about the loss of air and light from the planned condominium, filed a Request for Evaluation with the New York City Landmarks Preservation Commission in an attempt to have the building landmarked.  They wanted the Commission to hold an emergency hearing before the building was torn down.  Then, in July 2017, the appeals of the West Nineties Neighborhood Coalition to the NYCLPC and Community Board 7 and city officials had come up empty, and a State Supreme Court judge approved the synagogue's petition to sell the building to the developer, leaving the preservation effort out of options. The congregation plans to move out of the building to its temporary location at the Franciscan Center on West 97th Street after Yom Kippur.

See also 
 Congregation Shaare Zedek Cemetery
 Bayside Cemetery

References

External links 
 Shaare Zedek New York Official Website

Synagogues in Manhattan
Neoclassical synagogues
Synagogues completed in 1923
Religious organizations established in 1837
Conservative synagogues in New York City
Upper West Side
1837 establishments in New York (state)